Mesechthistatus binodosus is a species of beetle in the family Cerambycidae. It was described by Waterhouse in 1881.

Subspecies
 Mesechthistatus binodosus binodosus (Waterhouse, 1881)
 Mesechthistatus binodosus insularis Hayashi, 1955

References

Phrissomini
Beetles described in 1881